The 2019 Crawley Borough Council election took place on 2 May 2019 to elect members of Crawley Borough Council in West Sussex, England. This was on the same day as other local elections. The entire council was up for election after ward boundaries changed and the Labour Party retained control of the council.

Ward results

Bewbush & North Broadfield (3)

Broadfield (3)

Furnace Green (2)

Gossops Green & North East Broadfield (2)

Ifield (3)

Langley Green & Tushmore (3)

S

Maidenbower (3)

Northgate & West Green (3)

Pound Hill North & Forge Wood (3)

Pound Hill South & Worth (3)

Southgate (3)

Three Bridges (3)

Tilgate (2)

References

2019 English local elections
2019
2010s in West Sussex
May 2019 events in the United Kingdom